In World War II, Nazi Germany established brothels in the concentration camps (Lagerbordell) to create an incentive for prisoners to collaborate, although these institutions were used mostly by Kapos, "prisoner functionaries" and the criminal element, because regular inmates, penniless and emaciated, were usually too debilitated and wary of exposure to Schutzstaffel (SS) schemes. In the end, the camp brothels did not produce any noticeable increase in the prisoners' work productivity levels, but instead, created a market for coupons among the camp VIPs.

The women forced into these brothels came mainly from the Ravensbrück concentration camp, except for Auschwitz, which employed its own prisoners. In combination with the German military brothels in World War II, it is estimated that at least 34,140 female inmates were forced into sexual slavery during the Third Reich.

History and operation

The first camp brothel was established in Mauthausen/Gusen in 1942. After 30 June 1943, a camp brothel existed in Auschwitz, and from 15 July 1943, in Buchenwald. The one in Neuengamme was established in early 1944, Dachau's in May 1944, Dora-Mittelbau's in late summer, and Sachsenhausen's on 8 August 1944. There are conflicting dates for the camp brothel in Flossenbürg: one source claims summer 1943; another states it was not opened until 25 March 1944.

The camp brothels were usually built as barracks surrounded by a barbed-wire fence, with small individual rooms for up to 20 female prisoners, controlled by a female overseer (Aufseherin). The women were replaced frequently due to exhaustion and illness, and were usually sent away to their deaths later. The brothels were open only in the evenings. No Jewish male prisoners were allowed as patrons. Those with access to the customer lineup (Aryan VIPs only), had to sign up for a specific day and pay two reichsmarks for a 20-minute "service" based on a predetermined schedule. The women were matched with clients by an SS-man. The market for the "prize-coupons" was routinely cornered by the common criminals who wore the green triangles (hence the "green men" denomination). There is evidence (somewhat controversial) that in some of the brothels, women might have had tattoos inscribed on their chests saying Feld-Hure ("field whore"). Some of them underwent forced sterilizations as well as forced abortions, often resulting in death.

The subject of forced prostitution in the camps was alluded to in survivors' memoirs at least as early as 1972, when the first edition of Heinz Heger's book was published. However, the subject remained largely taboo in studies of Nazism until the mid-1990s, when new publications by female researchers broke the silence.

Sometimes the SS enticed women into serving in the brothels by promising them more humane treatment or reductions of their indefinite sentence. This caused anger or envy among some female inmates. Nina Michailovna, Russian camp prisoner, reported: "When we found out that a girl in our block was chosen, we caught her and threw a blanket on her and beat her up so badly that she could hardly move. It wasn't clear if she would recover. They just wanted to have a better life and we punished them this way."

Homosexual prisoners and camp brothels 

In addition to using camp brothels as a means to control inmates, encourage collaboration, and prevent riots and escapes, Heinrich Himmler intended them to be used as a means of teaching pink triangle prisoners "the joys of the opposite sex", i.e., as "therapy" for their homosexuality. Heger claims that Himmler directed that all gay prisoners were to make compulsory visits to the camp brothel once per week as a means of "curing" them of homosexuality.

Cultural references 
The French documentary Night and Fog mentioned the existence of concentration camp brothels as early as 1955.  This film, by director Alain Resnais, included extensive original footage of the camps and was based on interviews with survivors.
German concentration camp brothels were also re-enacted in fictional Nazi exploitation films made in the 1970s such as Ilsa, She Wolf of the SS, Last Orgy of the Third Reich, Love Camp 7, SS Experiment Camp and Nazi Love Camp 27.
Examples of Israeli literature on the subject include writer's Yehiel De-Nur alias K. Tzetnik's book The House of Dolls and the Stalag fiction genre.

Czech author Arnošt Lustig wrote a novel Lovely Green Eyes, which tells a story of a 15-year-old Jewish girl deported to a camp and forced to serve in a brothel during World War II. In the 1950s-set Australian television drama A Place to Call Home, main character Sarah Adams is an Australian who converted to Judaism and was imprisoned at Ravensbrück concentration camp before being forced into a camp brothel.

See also
 Comfort women (Japan)
 German military brothels in World War II
 German war crimes
 Recreation and Amusement Association (Japan)
 Sexual slavery by Germany during World War II
 War rape by German forces during World War II

Notes

Books 
 

Forced prostitution
Nazi war crimes
Unfree labor during World War II
Wartime sexual violence in World War II
Brothels
Nazi concentration camps